Cube: 3D Puzzle Mayhem, known as simply Cube in North America and as  (part of the Simple 2500 Portable series), is a puzzle video game developed by Metia Interactive and published by D3 Publisher in 2007.

Reception

The game received "mixed" reviews according to the review aggregation website Metacritic. In Japan, Famitsu gave it a score of 25 out of 40.

References

External links

2007 video games
D3 Publisher games
PlayStation Portable games
PlayStation Portable-only games
Puzzle video games
Video games developed in New Zealand